Hypericophyllum is a genus of African flowering plants in the daisy family.

 Species

References

Bahieae
Asteraceae genera
Flora of Africa